Crownies is an Australian television drama series which was originally broadcast on ABC1 from 14 July until 1 December 2011. The series revolves around a group of solicitors fresh from law school, working with Crown Prosecutors, who are the public prosecutors in the legal system of New South Wales, working for the office of the Director of Public Prosecutions (DPP).

Production
ABC1 ordered Crownies for a twenty-two-episode run and it was produced by Karl Zwicky. It was the first long-form drama format to be commissioned by the Australian Broadcasting Corporation since 2005's MDA. Filming began in January 2011. The location chosen for filming was Sydney, New South Wales. Many scenes were filmed in the business district Parramatta, more predominantly around the Parramatta Justice Precinct for the low financial cost and its accessibility. Alongside the Parramatta river shops, churches and streets were used for location shoots. Every twelve days a Brazilian restaurant located on Church Street would be converted into the set of "Gar's Bar", which served as the "legal hangout" for the characters. To cut costs, scenes requiring countryside settings were filmed a mere fifteen-minute drive away from Parramatta. The series finished filming in September 2011.

It is written by Greg Haddrick, Jane Allen, Kylie Needham, Tamara Asmar, Blake Ayshford, Chris Hawkshaw, Justine Gillmer, Pete McTighe, Stuart Page & Sam Miekle. It is directed by Tony Tilse, Chris Noonan, Cherie Nowlan, Grant Brown, Lynn Hegarty, Garth Maxwell and Jet Wilkinson.

On 24 January 2011, Greg Hassall from The Sydney Morning Herald announced the casting of Todd Lasance, Hamish Michael, Marta Dusseldorp and Jerome Ehlers.

Episodes

Cast

Main cast
 Todd Lasance as Ben McMahon
 Hamish Michael as Richard Stirling
 Ella Scott Lynch as Erin O'Shaughnessy
 Andrea Demetriades as Lina Badir
 Marta Dusseldorp as Janet King
 Indiana Evans as Tatum Novak
 Peter Kowitz as Tony Gillies
 Jeanette Cronin as Tracey Samuels
 Lewis Fitz-Gerald as David Sinclair QC
 Jerome Ehlers as Rhys Kowalski

Recurring
 Chantelle Jamieson as Julie Rousseau
 Christopher Morris as Andy Campbell
 Daniel Lissing as Conrad De Groot
 Marcus Graham as Danny Novak
 Aimee Pedersen as Ashleigh Larsson
 Ritchie Singer as The Honourable Mr Justice Rosenberg
 Paul Moxey as Harry
 Elias Joukhdar as Tariq Badir
 Petra Yared as Paula Corvini

Spin-off series

Before the series finale of Crownies had broadcast, ABC1 Channel Controller Brendan Dahill revealed that he sought the creation of a spin-off and singled out Dusseldorp and Michael for their portrayals. He believed that there were many successful aspects of Crownies to build on and expressed his surprise that the show was not as popular as he had envisioned. On 20 August 2012, ABC TV confirmed that it had commissioned an "8-part legal and political thriller" titled Janet King. The spin-off went into production in early 2013 and featured various cast members from Crownies. The first episode aired on 27 February 2014.

Home media
Crownies was initially released on region 4 DVD in two separate parts. The first eleven episodes were released on 6 October 2011. The remaining episodes were released on 1 December 2011. The two box-sets were later released for region 2.

Although the series has never been shown in the UK, it is available to view on the STV Player, the video on demand service owned by STV, the ITV affiliate in North and Central Scotland.

Reception

Critical analysis
Doug Anderson from The Sydney Morning Herald liked the show for the cast, "fresh" writing and good relationship between character. He believed anyone with intelligence could relate to the show. He praised the character of Tatum Novak for being the modern girl and branded the rest as fairly conventional characters, with personal issues blended in with cases. But his colleague Craig Mathieson criticised the show stating "The show is struggling to find an even tone and at various times it's flirtatiously sexy, coolly cynical and blazingly emotional. The problem is that these diverse moods jarringly occur one after the other. It's somewhat messy."

Awards and nominations

References

External links
 Official website
 Production website
 

2011 Australian television series debuts
2011 Australian television series endings
Australian drama television series
Australian legal television series
English-language television shows
Australian LGBT-related television shows
Lesbian-related television shows
Television shows set in New South Wales
Australian Broadcasting Corporation original programming
Television series by Screentime
Television series about prosecutors